Dorp means "village" in Dutch and Afrikaans.  It may refer to:

Places
Dorp, Netherlands, a neighborhood or other area within the city of Zoetermeer
Het Dorp, Netherlands, literally "the village", a neighborhood or other area near Arnhem
New Dorp, a district of Staten Island, New York, United States
Oude Dorp, the old name for what is now Old Town, Staten Island
Reeuwijk-Dorp, Netherlands, near Gouda
Ons Dorp, a neighbourhood of Menen

Other uses
 Dorp (band), a South African musical group based in London

See also
 Dorf (disambiguation)
 Thorp (disambiguation)